Abu Sulayman al-Utaybi was a Saudi Arabian Islamic militant who is noted as a critic of the leadership of the Islamic State of Iraq.

History
He was born 1980 in Saudi Arabia. He studied at the prestigious Imam Muhammad ibn Saud Islamic University. He abandoned his studies in 2006 and joined al-Qaeda in Iraq (AQI) His name was in the Sinjar Records, a database of AQI personnel found in September 2007.

He was made Chief Judge of the Islamic State of Iraq in March 2007. He released public sermons in April and June 2007.

He left the Islamic State of Iraq in August 2007 with Abu Dujanah al-Qahtani, and traveled across Iran with the assistance of Ansar al-Sunna to Pakistan.

He was a critic of the leadership of Abu Ayyub al-Masri and Abu Omar al-Baghdadi.

Death
He was killed in an American airstrike in Paktia province, Afghanistan in May 2008.

References

1980 births
2008 deaths
Imam Muhammad ibn Saud Islamic University alumni
Members of al-Qaeda in Iraq
Saudi Arabian al-Qaeda members
Saudi Arabian Islamists